Mount Ida is a historic home located near Scottsville, Albemarle County, Virginia. It was built between about 1785 and 1805, and is a two-story, five-bay frame plantation house. It has a one-bay west wing. The interior features a parlor with elaborately carved paneling. The house was moved to a 422.65-acre site, with an elevated knoll located along a bend in the Hardware River, in 1995.

It was added to the National Register of Historic Places in 1987.

References

External links
Owner's website

Houses on the National Register of Historic Places in Virginia
Houses completed in 1805
Houses in Albemarle County, Virginia
National Register of Historic Places in Albemarle County, Virginia
1805 establishments in Virginia